In Scottish and Northern English folklore, a shellycoat is a type of bogeyman that haunts rivers and streams.

Name
The name comes from the coat of shells these creatures are said to wear, which rattle upon movement.

Distribution
Many places on the coast of Scotland have names that reference the shellycoat. Supposedly, shellycoats are particularly fond of the area around the River Hermitage.

Characteristics
Shellycoats are considered to be relatively harmless; they may mislead wanderers, particularly those they think are trespassing upon the creature's territory, but without malice.  A common tactic of a shellycoat would be to cry out as if drowning and then laugh at the distracted victim.

As described above, the shellycoat shares many of the traits of the Brag, Kelpie and Nix.

Schellenrock 
Jacob Grimm stated in his Deutsche Mythologie that the Scottish goblin Shellycoat is one and the same as the German Schellenrock,  that is bell-coat:

Thomas Keightly quotes Grimm and classifies the shellycoat as a type of brownie.:

The domestic nature of the shellycoat emphasized by Grimm and Keightly stands in contradistinction to the wild nature of the water sprites mentioned in other sources.

Bibliography 
 Briggs, Katharine Mary. The Fairies in English Tradition and Literature. University of Chicago Press, London, 1967.
 Grimm, Jacob.  Deutsche Mythologie. Vollständige Ausgabe. Marix Verlag: Wiesbaden 2007, . English version at Northvegr Grimm's Teutonic Mythology Translation Project.  Available online at http://www.northvegr.org/lore/grimmst/017_14.php
 Keightley, Thomas.  The Fairy Mythology: Illustrative of the Romance and Superstition of Various Countries. 1870.  Available online at http://www.sacred-texts.com/neu/celt/tfm/tfm130.htm.

References

Northumbrian folklore
Northumbrian folkloric beings
Scottish folklore
Scottish legendary creatures
English legendary creatures
Water spirits
Bogeymen